GWA or Gwa may refer to:

Languages 
 Gua language (ISO 693-3: gwx), a Guang language of coastal Ghana
 Gwa language (ISO 693-3: gwb), a Jarawan language of northern Nigeria
 Mbato language (ISO 693-3: gwa), a Kwa language of Ivory Coast and Ghana

Science 
 GWA study or GWAS, Genome-wide association study
 GW approximation, in quantum field theory

Places 
 Gwa, Myanmar, a town
 Gwa Township, Myanmar, which includes the town

Organizations 
 Game Workers Alliance, trade union of the video game company Activision Blizzard
 Gay Women's Alternative, in Washington, DC, United States
 Georgia Writers Association, in the United States
 Global Workspace Alliance, a trade organization
 Global Wesleyan Alliance, a Methodist organization
 German World Alliance, a worldwide organization of the Germans abroad
 George Walton Academy, a private school in Monroe, Georgia, United States
 George Washington Academy, an American school in Morocco
 Georgia Women of Achievement, an organization in the United States
 Golden West Airlines, a defunct American airline
 Great Western Arms Company, a defunct American firearms manufacturer
 GWA Group, an Australian company
 One Rail Australia, an Australian rail freight operator formerly known as Genesee & Wyoming Australia